First Baptist Church of Weedsport is a historic Baptist church located at Weedsport in Cayuga County, New York. It is a masonry structure built in 1870 that substantially modified a meetinghouse built in 1839 and enlarged in 1854. The main block retains the core of the earlier building. The church, which consists of the "L" shaped main block, an engaged bell tower, and a hyphen linking the rear of the church to the Fellowship Building (built 1921), was constructed of load bearing brick walls above a limestone foundation. The building displays an eclectic mix of Romanesque Revival and Renaissance Revival styles.

It was listed on the National Register of Historic Places in 2002.

References

Churches on the National Register of Historic Places in New York (state)
Baptist churches in New York (state)
Churches completed in 1839
Churches in Cayuga County, New York
National Register of Historic Places in Cayuga County, New York